

Lok Sabha 
The Lok Sabha (meaning "House of the People") is the lower house of the Parliament of India, elected by the state electorates of Jharkhand.

Current constituencies

Keys:  

 Source: Parliament of India (Lok Sabha)

Rajya Sabha
The Rajya Sabha (meaning the "Council of States") is the upper house of the Parliament of India. Jharkhand state elects three members and they are indirectly elected by the state legislators of Jharkhand. The number of seats allocated to the party, are determined by the number of seats a party possesses during nomination and the party nominates a member to be voted on. Elections within the state legislatures are held using Single transferable vote with proportional representation.

Current members
Keys:

See also 
 List of constituencies of the Jharkhand Legislative Assembly

References 

Elections in Jharkhand
Politics of Jharkhand
Parliamentary constituencies